Qaleh-ye Abbasabad may refer to:

 Qaleh-ye Abbasabad, Fars
 Qaleh-ye Abbasabad, Khondab, Markazi Province
 Qaleh-ye Abbasabad, Shazand, Markazi Province